Caja (pronounced  ) was a Google project for sanitizing third party HTML, CSS and JavaScript. On January 31, 2021, Google archived the project due to known vulnerabilities and lack of maintenance to keep up with the latest web security research, recommending instead the Closure toolkit.

Caja was designed by Google research scientist Mark S. Miller in 2008 as a JavaScript implementation for "virtual iframes" based on the principles of object-capabilities. It would take JavaScript (technically, ECMAScript 5 strict mode code), HTML, and CSS input and rewrite it into a safe subset of HTML and CSS, plus a single JavaScript function with no free variables.  That means the only way such a function could modify an object, was if it was given a reference to the object by the host page.  Instead of giving direct references to DOM objects, the host page typically gives references to wrappers that sanitize HTML, proxy URLs, and prevent redirecting the page; this allowed Caja to prevent certain phishing and cross-site scripting attacks, and prevent downloading malware.  Also, since all rewritten programs ran in the same frame, the host page could allow one program to export an object reference to another program; then inter-frame communication was simply method invocation.

The word "caja" is Spanish for "box" or "safe" (as in a bank), the idea being that Caja could safely contain JavaScript programs as well as being a capabilities-based JavaScript.

Caja was used by Google in its Google Apps Script products. In 2008 MySpace and Yahoo! had both deployed a very early version of Caja.

See also 
 Joe-E, an object-capability subset of Java
 E

References

External links 

 Caja project home page
 Caja project source code
 Caja playground
 Caja draft specification: "Safe active content in sanitized JavaScript", Mark S. Miller, Mike Samuel, Ben Laurie, Ihab Awad, Mike Stay
 Yahoo!/Google Caja Javascript Sandbox

Capability systems
Transformation languages